The 2002 Australian Nations Cup Championship was CAMS sanctioned Australian motor racing title open to GT type cars complying with both Group 3E Series Production Car regulations as published by CAMS and Nations Cup regulations as published by Procar Australia. The title, which was the third Australian Nations Cup Championship, was won by Jim Richards driving a Porsche 911 GT3 Cup.

Schedule
The championship was contested over an eight-round series.

Points system
Outright points were awarded on a 60, 55, 50, 45, 40, 36, 32, 28, 24, 20, 17, 14, 11, 8, 6, 5, 4, 3, 2, 1 basis to the top twenty placegetters in each race with an additional point awarded to the driver gaining pole position for the round.

The same scale was used to award points in Group Two, which was restricted to models nominated as Group Two in PROCAR Australia's Vehicle Eligibility Schedule.

Results
Championship results were as follows:

References

Australian Nations Cup Championship
Nations Cup Championship